The Raid on Charles Town, or Spanish raid on New Providence, was a Spanish naval expedition on 19 January 1684 (O.S.) led by Cuban corsair Juan de Alarcón against the English privateering stronghold of Charles Town (later renamed Nassau), capital of the Bahamas.

The Bahamas harboured pirates and privateers who preyed on Spanish ships. Governor Clarke, described as "one of Cromwell's officers" justified privateering as necessary for the colony's defence, but in one letter of marque he authorized offensive attacks on Spanish holdings far from the Bahamas. Clarke's encouragement of privateering contravened and jeopardized the 1667 and 1670 treaties of Madrid, which established peace between the English and Spanish. On 19 January 1684 (O.S.), a Spanish expedition reduced the Bahamian settlements and defenses to ruins, carrying off the governor in chains, together with the inhabitants. Clarke was tortured to death and his body was roasted after an approved judgement set by the Inquisition. John Oldmixon claimed that Clarke died being roasted on a spit after the Spaniards had killed him.
The Bahamas subsequently remained devoid of any recognizable English presence until December 1686.

Background
Spain's corsair Juan de Alarcón stealthily approached to New Providence with a commission issued by Governor José Fernández de Córdoba and a pair of barcos luengos carrying 200 men. Having seized a woodcutting sloop off the island of Andros, Alarcón compelled its master William Bell to pilot in via the eastern channel. At daybreak Alarcón disembarked 150 men within a half-mile outside Charles Town (later Nassau), while his corsair ships bore down upon the six vessels anchored in its harbour.

Raid
Charles Town's population consisted of approximately 400 men capable of bearing arms plus perhaps 200 women, a like number of children, and 200 slaves. Taken utterly by surprise, they were incapable of mounting an effective defense. Former governor Robert Clarke was wounded and captured as he attempted to mount a feeble countercharge, while his recently arrived successor Robert Lilburne fled from his bedroom in the Wheel of Fortune, along with most other residents. The 10-gun New England frigate Good Intent of Capt. William Warren and another anchored vessel managed to escape across the bar, leaving the Spaniards to pillage the remaining four ships and quickly ransack the town, loading their plunder aboard their largest prize before torching the rest and sailing away that same evening. Alarcón thereupon hastened across to northern Eleuthera and visited a like treatment upon its English settlement, before returning to Charles Town on 15 November 1684 (O.S.) to set fire on its buildings and carry off numerous residents to Havana. The Bahamas subsequently remained devoid of any recognizable English presence until December 1686, when a small contingent from Jamaica under the preacher Thomas Bridges reoccupied New Providence Island, where more colonists gradually joined them.

Aftermath
Most of its buildings were burned, and the Bahamas were left depopulated. Some 200 colonists sought refuge on Jamaica while another 50 from northern Eleuthera temporarily resettled in Casco (Maine), leaving the Bahamas devoid of Englishmen until 1686. Upon the departure of the Spaniards, the settlers pulled themselves together again and a new governor, Robert Lilburne, came back from England.

Notes

References 

17th century in the Bahamas
1684 in the Caribbean
Battles involving England
Conflicts in 1684
Military raids
Naval battles involving Spain
Wars involving the Bahamas